St. Louis Community College–Forest Park (also known as STLCC-Forest Park, and Forest Park) is a public community college in St. Louis, Missouri. It is one of the four schools of the St. Louis Community College System and is one of nine community colleges in Greater St. Louis. Over 8,200 students attend Forest Park, making it the second largest community college in Missouri.

History 

Before STLCC-Forest Park existed, its campus had been the site of an amusement park known as Forest Park Highlands, which opened in the late 19th century and was destroyed in July 1963 by a major fire that started at one of the park's restaurants.

Classes began at Forest Park in 1967, two years after a $47.2 million bond issue was approved to pay for construction across the Junior College District (JCD) of St. Louis-St. Louis County and five years after the district itself was approved by voters. The Forest Park campus was completed in 1970.  In 1976, the JCD changed its name to St. Louis Community College at Florissant Valley, Forest Park and Meramec.

In 1999, the  Jack E. Miller Hospitality Studies Center opened at Forest Park, with "state-of-the-art facilities for culinary arts."

On September 24, 2009, a suspicious package was found in a men's restroom in the D Building.  It was removed by the St. Louis Police Department Bomb and Arson Squad.  The next day, the police announced that the package had contained a live bomb and would have caused "moderate to heavy damage" if it had exploded.

Campus 
STLCC-Forest Park is an urban campus, located next to I-64/U.S. Route 40 in the Forest Park area of St. Louis. The campus is close to two MetroLink Light rail stations at Forest Park-DeBaliviere and Central West End

Programs 
STLCC-Forest Park is known for its allied health care education. Major programs include Associate in Applied Science Degrees including: Nursing, Radiologic Technology, Dental Hygiene, Dental Assisting,  Respiratory Therapy Polysomnography, and Clinical Laboratory Technology.

STLCC-Forest Park offers number of construction-related degrees in Automotive Technology, Building Inspection & Code Enforcement Technology, Plumbing Design Engineering Technology, and Fire Protection Technology. Forest Park has the Jack Miller Hospitality Studies Program which prepares students for the hospitality industry, including programs in Culinary Arts, Baking and Pastry Arts and Hotel Management. Practical culinary courses include intense studies in the process of making chocolate.

Career courses leading to a Class A CDL (Commercial Drivers License) are offered, with driver training facilities on campus.

Humanities programs in drama, theater production, music, fine art and commercial art attract many students. The campus is home to the Mildred E. Bastian Center for the Performance Arts.

An associate degree program in Funeral Sciences is offered.

Athletics 
STLCC operates as a single entity in athletic competition; Forest Park students are permitted to participate if eligible.

Forest Park serves as "home court" for Men's and Women's Basketball.

STLCC teams are called "Archers". Prior to STLCC consolidating athletic programs under one banner, STLCC-Forest Park was known as the Highlanders.

Notable alumni
Josh Outman, former Major League Baseball player.

References

External links
St. Louis Community College STLCC-Forest Park

Educational institutions established in 1967
Forest Park
Two-year colleges in the United States
Universities and colleges in St. Louis
Universities and colleges in St. Louis County, Missouri